Raga Asavari is a Hindustani classical raga. It belongs to the Asavari thaat and is performed in the morning hours.

In pre-Bhatkhande days this Asavari used the Komal Rishab instead of Shuddh Rishab. When Bhatkhandeji created the thaat process, he changed that Asavari's Komal Rishab to Shuddha Rishab but the name remained the same. From that time the old or real 'Asavari' has been called the Komal Rishabh Asavari, and the new Shuddha Rishabh Asavari is simply called 'Asavari'.

Raga Asavari and Komal Rishabh Asavari also appears in the Sikh tradition from northern India and is part of the Sikh holy scripture called Sri Guru Granth Sahib. Sikh Gurus Sri Guru Ramdas Ji and Sri Guru Arjun Dev Ji used these ragas. The Raga Komal Rishabh Asavari appears as 'Raga Asavari Sudhang' in Sri Guru Granth Sahib Ji.

Structure 
Thaat: Asavari

Jati: Audava-Sampoorna

Arohana: 

Avarohana: 

Vadi: 

Samavadi: 

Pakad: 

Time: Second period of the day (9am-12pm)

Mood: Renunciation and sacrifice

Organization and relationships 
The ragas closest to Asavari are Komal Rishabh Asavari and Jaunpuri and it is part of the Kanada Raga group

Film songs 
Note that the following songs are composed in Natabhairavi, the equivalent of raga Asavari in Carnatic music.

Language:Tamil

Hindi 
 Hume Aur Jeene Ki by Kishore Kumar and Lata Mangeshkar

Notes

References 

 Bor, Joep (ed). Rao, Suvarnalata; der Meer, Wim van; Harvey, Jane (co-authors) The Raga Guide: A Survey of 74 Hindustani Ragas. Zenith Media, London: 1999.

External links 
 SRA on Samay and Ragas
 SRA on Ragas and Thaats
 Rajan Parrikar on Asavari
 Film Songs in Rag Asavari
 More details about raga Asavari

Hindustani ragas